The 2015 National Games, also known as the 35th National Games of India, was a national multi-sport event held in the Indian state of Kerala, from 31 January to 14 February. An estimated total of 11,641 athletes from 37 teams participated in 405 events in 33 sports. It was the second edition to be hosted by Kerala, the first being 1987.

All of the states and union territories of India and the Indian Armed Forces' Services Sports Control Board (Services) participated in the event. Telangana made its debut at the National games after becoming a state and finished 11th with 33 medals overall. Athletes from every participating team (except Dadra and Nagar Haveli, Lakshadweep, Nagaland, Puducherry, and Sikkim) won medals. Among the medalling teams, thirty won at least one gold medal. Keralite swimmer Sajan Prakash won six gold medals and two silver medals, making him the most successful athlete of the event. Andaman and Nicobar Islands' Rajina Kiro, Madhya Pradesh's Inaocha Devi Mayanglambam, and Maharashtra's Aakanksha Vora won five gold medals and one silver medal, becoming the most decorated female athletes at these Games. Prakash broke the national record in 400 meters freestyle and 200 meters butterfly. Kerala's Tintu Luka broke the eighteen years old national record in 800 metres. Services' swimmer Madhu PS set a new national record in the 100 and 200 meters backstroke, and won four gold medals.

A total of 1334 medals (405 gold, 406 silver and 523 bronze) were awarded. Athletics, swimming, shooting, canoeing and kayaking, wrestling, cycling, and gymnastics accounted for almost half of the total medals awarded. The Services topped the medal table for a consecutive third time, having collected 91 gold medals. The host state, Kerala, secured the second position with 54 gold medals; it also secured the most silver medals (48), the most bronze medals (60), and the most medals overall (162). Haryana athletes claimed 107 medals in total (including 40 gold), earning third spot on the table.

Medal table

The ranking in this table is consistent with Indian Olympic Association convention in its published medal tables. By default, the table is ordered by the number of gold medals the athletes from a team have won. The number of silver medals is taken into consideration next, followed by the number of bronze medals. If nations are still tied, equal ranking is given; they are listed alphabetically.

The total number of bronze medals is greater than the total number of gold or silver medals because two bronze medals were awarded per event in twelve sports: badminton, boxing, fencing, judo, kabaddi, kho-kho, lawn bowls, squash, table tennis, taekwondo, tennis, wrestling and wushu (in seven events out of fifteen). In the women's high jump event of athletics, a tie for the second position between two athletes from West Bengal and Madhya Pradesh meant that two silver medals (and no bronze) were awarded.

References
General

Specific

External links 
 

2015 National Games of India